Joe Nichols is the debut studio album of American country music artist Joe Nichols. It was released on August 27, 1996 by Intersound Records, it produced the singles "Six of One, Half a Dozen of the Other", "I Hate the Way I Love You", "To Tell You the Truth, I Lied", and "Wal-Mart Parking Lot Social Club". None of these singles charted on the Billboard Hot Country Songs charts in the U.S., but "Six of One, Half a Dozen (Of the Other)" reached number 74 on the RPM Top Country Tracks charts in Canada. It also reached #63 on the Cash Box Country Singles Chart. "She Could Care Less" was previously recorded by Shenandoah on their 1994 album In the Vicinity of the Heart.

Release history
The album was re-issued twice: first in 2002 as Six of One, Half Dozen of the Other on Row Music Group, and again in 2003 as The Early Years on Infinity Nashville. The 2003 re-issue featured the tracks in a different order, as well as a bonus DVD featuring four videos.

Track listing (Joe Nichols and Six of One, Half Dozen of the Other)

Track listing (The Early Years)

Personnel
Adapted from AllMusic:

 Spady Brannan - bass guitar 
 Jim Collins - backing vocals
 Thomas Flora - backing vocals
 Larry Franklin - fiddle
 Dennis Holt - drums
 Chris Leuzinger - electric guitar
 B. James Lowry - acoustic guitar 
 Terry McMillan - harmonica
 Steve Nathan - keyboards
 Scott Sanders - steel guitar
 Joe Nichols - lead vocals

Chart performance

Singles

References

1996 debut albums
Joe Nichols albums